The Villa della Regina is a palace in the city of Turin, Piedmont, Italy. It was originally built by the House of Savoy in the 17th century.

In 1997, it was placed on the UNESCO World Heritage Site list along with 13 other residences of the House of Savoy.

History

The original structure was designed in early 1615 by the Italian soldier, architect and military engineer, Ascanio Vitozzi. When he died in 1615, the project passed to his collaborators, father and son Carlo and Amedeo di Castellamonte. The original building was built for the Prince-Cardinal Maurice of Savoy during the reign of his brother Victor Amadeus I, Duke of Savoy. The property was built as a private villa with its own vineyard, hence its alternative name of Vigna di Madama. In 1637 Cardinal Maurice lost his brother and his sister in law Christine Marie of France became Regent of Savoy for her young son, Carlo Emanuele II of Savoye.

Prince Maurice of Savoy and his brother Thomas Francis, Prince of Carignano opposed the Regency and fled to Spain. Following his return to Turin, Maurice died at the Villa in 1657 and willed it to his wife Louise Christine of Savoy who also died there in 1692. At the death of Louise Christine, it passed to Anne Marie d'Orléans, niece of Louis XIV of France wife Victor Amadeus II, Duke of Savoy in 1684.

She used the Vigna when she could. Most of the present décor of the Vigna is from her lifetime. Her husband was the King of Sicily from 1713 until 1720, when he exchanged Sicily with Sardinia. From then on, the building was known as Villa della Regina ("Villa of the Queen"). It was here Anne Marie died in 1728. Anne Marie's eldest daughter Maria Adelaide came here and tried to recreate it at Versailles at the Ménagerie.

Polyxena of Hesse-Rotenburg, daughter in law of Anne Marie, did some work in the main saloon of the building when she became the owner of the villa in 1728 at the death of Anne Marie.

Inside there are frescoes and paintings by Giovanni Battista Crosato, Daniel Seyter and Corrado Giaquinto in the main room, grotesques of Filippo Minei and paintings by the brothers Domenico and Giuseppe Valeriani in the near rooms; there are also precious Chinese Cabinets in lacquer and golden wood. In the park there is the Pavilion of the Solinghi, pagoda building in which the Academy of the Solinghi used to meet; it was a group of intellectuals founded by the Cardinal Maurice.

The Villa was later used by the Spanish Queen of Sardinia Maria Antonietta Ferdinanda. It remained the property of the House of Savoy until 1868 when it was donated by Victor Emmanuel II of Italy to the Institute of the Army's Daughters and in 1994 it was given to the State domain.

Damaged in the Second World War, it is today open to the public in order to fund its maintenance.

Notes

External links
 Villa della Regina  

Residences of the Royal House of Savoy
Buildings and structures in Turin
Palaces in Piedmont
Historic house museums in Italy
Museums in Turin
National museums of Italy
Houses completed in the 17th century
World Heritage Sites in Italy
Buildings and structures in the Metropolitan City of Turin